Irina Zvereva (née Fateeva; ; born 11 April 1967) is a former professional tennis player who represented the Soviet Union and the Commonwealth of Independent States. She competed in the doubles event at the 1990 Moscow Open, a tournament on the WTA Tour, losing her opening match to Denisa Krajčovičová and Alice Noháčová while partnering with compatriot Elena Pogorelova. Zvereva was ranked as high as No. 4 in her country, and was known for her one-handed backhand.

Zvereva resides in Germany and has German citizenship. Her husband Alexander Mikhailovich Zverev is a former Soviet professional tennis player. Her sons Mischa Zverev and Alexander Zverev are both German professional tennis players.

Tennis career
Zvereva's career was limited while living in the Soviet Union. The government restricted when Zvereva and her husband could leave the country to compete in international tournaments. In particular, they were not allowed to leave the country at the same time. After leaving the Soviet Union to go to Germany in 1991, Zvereva began representing the Commonwealth of Independent States and had more opportunity to enter events on the ITF Women's Circuit. She reached five singles finals on the circuit, winning one title against German Anja Franken in Germany. Three of the five singles finals were in Germany, while the other two were in Greece. Her last runner-up came against Julia Apostoli, a fellow Soviet emigrant as well as the mother of Stefanos Tsitsipas, a rival of her son Alexander Zverev.

ITF finals

Singles: 5 (1 title, 4 runner-ups)

Doubles: 2 (1 title, 1 runner-up)

National championships finals

Doubles (0–1)

References

External links
 
 

1967 births
Living people
Soviet female tennis players
Russian female tennis players
Soviet emigrants to Germany
Russian emigrants to Germany
Naturalized citizens of Germany
Sportspeople from Sochi